This list of rogue waves compiles incidents of known and likely rogue waves – also known as freak waves, monster waves, killer waves, and extreme waves. These are dangerous and rare ocean surface waves that unexpectedly reach at least twice the height of the tallest waves around them, and are often described by witnesses as "walls of water". They occur in deep water, usually far out at sea, and are a threat even to capital ships and ocean liners.

In addition to the incidents listed below, it has also been suggested that these types of waves may be responsible for the loss of several low-flying United States Coast Guard helicopters on search and rescue missions.

Background 
Anecdotal evidence from mariners' testimonies and incidents of wave damage to ships have long suggested rogue waves occurred; however, their scientific measurement was positively confirmed only following measurements of the Draupner wave, a rogue wave at the Draupner platform, in the North Sea on 1 January 1995. During this event, minor damage was inflicted on the platform, confirming that the reading was valid.

In modern oceanography, rogue waves are defined not as the biggest possible waves at sea, but instead as extreme sized waves for a given sea state.

Many of these encounters are only reported in the media, and are not examples of open ocean rogue waves. Often a huge wave is loosely and incorrectly denoted as a rogue wave. Extremely large waves offer an explanation for the otherwise-inexplicable disappearance of many ocean-going vessels. However, the claim is contradicted by information held by Lloyd's Register. One of the very few cases where evidence suggests a freak wave incident is the 1978 loss of the freighter .

Known or suspected rogue wave incidents

Before 1950

 On 11 March 1861 at midday the lighthouse on Eagle Island, off the west coast of Ireland was struck by a large wave that smashed 23 panes, washing some of the lamps down the stairs and damaging the reflectors with broken glass beyond repair.
 On 13 November 1865, the wooden cutter Aenid was in the Tasman Sea near Long Reef off New South Wales, Australia, when her helmsman sighted three huge waves approaching from her starboard quarter. Before he could turn the cutter to face them, they swamped Aenid and wrecked her with the loss of two lives. Four others on board survived. The wreck later was found washed up on Long Reef with part of its side smashed in.
 On 15 December 1900, three lighthouse keepers mysteriously disappeared from the Flannan Isles Lighthouse in the Outer Hebrides of Scotland during a storm. Although there were no surviving witnesses, a rogue wave that hit the west side of the island has been hypothesized to be responsible.
 On 10 October 1903, the British passenger liner  was only four hours out of New York City when, at 2:30 p.m., a freak wave struck her. The wave carried away part of the forebridge and smashed the guardrail stanchions. There were a number of first-class passengers sitting in deck chairs close to the bridge and they caught the full force of the water. One passenger was fatally injured and several other passengers were hurt.
 The Blue Anchor Line luxury steamer SS Waratah, an Australian ship of 16,000 gross register tons, disappeared without trace south of Durban, South Africa, in July 1909 with 211 passengers and crew aboard. No survivors or wreckage were found. The most plausible theory for her disappearance is that she encountered a rogue wave which either caused her to capsize or flooded her cargo holds, sinking her almost instantly.
 On 7 November 1915 at 2:27 a.m., the British battleship  suffered severe damage during a storm in the Pentland Firth when two large waves struck her in rapid succession. Water rose as high as the bottom of her lower foretop, filling it with water, sweeping her forward deck clear, smashing her forebridge – much of which was found in pieces on her upper deck – wrecking her chart house, shifting the roof of her conning tower, and flooding her forward main gun turret, mess decks, and flats. Five of her crew died, and 17 others suffered serious injuries.
 At midnight on 5–6 May 1916 the British polar explorer Ernest Shackleton was at the tiller of the small sailboat James Caird in the Southern Ocean during a storm when he thought he saw the bad weather clearing in the west, astern. He then realized that what he thought was a line of white clouds above a clear dark sky was actually the crest of a single enormous wave that struck and nearly swamped the boat. Shackleton reported that the wave was larger than any he had ever seen before in his 26 years of seafaring.
The waves also damaged and nearly capsized the U.S. Navy gunboat , which also was in the harbor. Once described as a tsunami, the waves have more recently been assessed as exceptionally large, freak wind-driven waves generated by passing hurricanes.
 In August 1924, the British ocean liner  arrived in New York City late after steaming through a hurricane off the United States East Coast in which a  rogue wave struck her, injuring seven people, smashing numerous windows and portholes, carrying away one of her lifeboats, and snapping chairs and other fittings from their fastenings.
 In February 1926 in the North Atlantic a massive wave hit the British passenger liner , smashing four of the bridge's nine glass windows and doing some other damage.
 In 1933 in the North Pacific, the U.S. Navy oiler  encountered a huge wave.
 In 1934 in the North Atlantic an enormous wave smashed over the bridge of the British passenger liner , injuring the first officer and the White Star Lines final commodore, Edgar J. Trant, who was hospitalised for a month and never sailed again.
 In December 1942 while operating as a troopship and carrying 11,339 United States Army troops and crew, the British passenger liner  was broadsided during a gale by a  wave  from Scotland and nearly capsized. Queen Mary listed briefly about 52 degrees before slowly righting herself.

Second half of the 20th century
 On 5 February 1963, the French Navy light cruiser Jeanne d'Arc encountered a rogue wave while serving as the training ship of the French Naval Academy.
 The Wilstar, a Norwegian tanker, suffered structural damage from a rogue wave in 1974.
  was a lake freighter that sank suddenly during a gale storm on 10 November 1975, while on Lake Superior, on the Canada–United States border. All 29 members of the crew perished.
 In October 1977, the tanker  encountered a rogue wave on a voyage across the Pacific from Singapore to Portland, Oregon. Her engineer took photos of the wave, which was higher than the  bridge deck.
 The six-year-old, 37,134-ton barge carrier  was lost at sea in 1978. At 3 a.m. on 12 December 1978 she sent out a garbled mayday message from the mid-Atlantic, but rescuers found only "a few bits of wreckage." The Maritime Court concluded that "bad weather had caused an unusual event." It is thought that a large wave knocked out the ship's controls (the bridge was sited forward), causing the ship to shift side-on to heavy seas, which eventually overwhelmed it. Although more than one wave was probably involved, this remains the most likely sinking due to a freak wave.
 The Ocean Ranger (North Atlantic, 1981), a semi-submersible mobile offshore drilling unit, sank with all hands in storm seas of  after a wave higher than  flooded the platform's ballast control room, although there has been no official suggestion that it was caused by a rogue wave.
The Fastnet Lighthouse off the south coast of Ireland was struck by a 47-meter-high (154-foot-high) wave in 1985.
The trimaran Rose-Noëlle, capsized on 4 June 1989, when she was struck by a rogue wave in the southern Pacific Ocean off the coast of New Zealand.
The fishing boat Andrea Gail was lost with all hands off the coast of Nova Scotia on October 28, 1991, when she got caught in the 1991 Perfect Storm while returning to Gloucester, Massachusetts, after fishing on the Grand Banks of Newfoundland. Evidence that whatever happened sank Andrea Gail very quickly was found after debris and flotsam from her washed up on Sable Island. None of the bodies of her six crewmen were ever found.
 The liner Queen Elizabeth 2 encountered a  wave during Hurricane Luis in the North Atlantic in September 1995. Her master said it "came out of the darkness" and "looked like the White Cliffs of Dover." Newspaper reports at the time described the ocean liner as attempting to "surf" the nearly vertical wave in order not to be sunk.
 On 4 November 2000, the Channel Islands National Marine Sanctuary research vessel R/V Ballena was hit by a rogue wave and capsized near Point Conception off Santa Barbara, California. Two United States Geological Survey (USGS) crew members were trapped briefly inside the capsized ship, but they were able to find their way to the bridge doors and escaped. The life raft was inflated and the three attempted to paddle out of the surf zone. The size of the raft and drogue anchor prevented escape in the raft. The USGS crew donned the two available life jackets and all three attempted to swim to a pocket beach on Point Arguello. After the captain made shore he swam back out to assist both of the USGS crew to shore. One USGS crew member was treated for facial lacerations and a slight concussion. Ballena, operated by National Oceanic and Atmospheric Administration (NOAA) at the time, broke apart in the waves against the rocky shore and was a total loss.

21st century
 The Bahamian-registered cruise ships  and MS Caledonian Star encountered  freak waves in the South Atlantic in 2001. Bridge windows on both ships were smashed, and all power and instrumentation lost. 
 Naval Research Laboratory ocean-floor pressure sensors detected a freak wave caused by Hurricane Ivan in the Gulf of Mexico in 2004.
 Norwegian Dawn, (three waves in succession, off the coast of Georgia, 16 April 2005): "The sea had actually calmed down when the  wave seemed to come out of thin air… Our captain, who has 20 years on the job, said he never saw anything like it." "The water exerted enough force to shear off the welds for the aluminum rail supports on the [ninth and tenth level] balconies of two cabins, allowing the teak balcony rails to break loose and crash into the cabin windows. The broken glass filling the drains compounded the water damage by allowing a large amount of water to enter the two cabins and damage the carpets in 61 other cabins. The ship's operating at reduced speed when the waves hit probably limited the damage."
 Aleutian Ballad, (Bering Sea, 2005): Footage of a rogue wave appears in an episode of Deadliest Catch from Season 2, Episode 4 "Finish Line" (Original airdate: 28 April 2006). While sailing through rough seas during a night time storm, a "freak wave", believed to be around 60 feet (18 meters) high, violently hits the fishing vessel's starboard side. The wave cripples the vessel, causing the boat to tip onto its side at a 30-degree angle. The boat manages to right itself; some of the crew suffer minor injuries. One of the few video recordings of (what might be) a rogue wave.
 38 miles off Merritt Island, Bahamas, June 2005 – two participants in a fishing competition, struck by pair of rogue waves which capsized their 34 ft boat. Described in print: "One second everything is going great. The next second we're upside down in the Atlantic Ocean, 30 miles out ... We weren't going fast, but the speed of the wave – the back wave pushed us into the front one", and on radio: "The sea had essentially dropped out ... It was just like we were just tumbling straight down and picking up speed at a wave that was triple the size of what we were just dealing with". Rescued by Coast Guard 30 hours later, after an extended search.
 Norwegian Spirit, (off the coast of Tortola, January 2006)
There were around 40 injuries, with some requiring hospitalization.
 14 April 2008, half a nautical mile off Kleinbaai, near Gansbaai, South Africa – freak wave hit tourists diving to see sharks. The shark diving boat capsized. Three tourists died, two were seriously injured and a number treated for shock. Multiple other shark boats witnessed the wave.
 On 3 March 2010, in the Mediterranean Sea off Marseille, France, a  wave hit the Cypriot liner Louis Majesty, killing two people on board. The height of the wave was reported to be abnormally high with respect to the sea state at the time of the incident.
 On September 8, 2019, in the Cabot Strait off Channel-Port aux Basques, Newfoundland, during Hurricane Dorian, several rogue waves were detected by an off-shore buoy.
 In 2022, the Viking cruise ship Viking Polaris was hit by a rogue wave on its way to Ushuaia, Argentina. One person died, four more were injured, and the ship's scheduled route to Antarctica was canceled.

References

Oceanography
Ocean currents
Water waves
Weather hazards